The 2005 Bass Pro Shops MBNA 500 was the 33nd stock car race of the 2005 NASCAR Nextel Cup Series season, the seventh race of the 2005 Chase for the Nextel Cup, and the 46th iteration of the event. The race was held on Sunday, October 30, 2005, before a crowd of 120,000 in Hampton, Georgia at Atlanta Motor Speedway, a 1.54 miles (2.48 km) permanent asphalt quad-oval intermediate speedway. The race took the scheduled 325 laps to complete. At race's end, rookie Carl Edwards of Roush Racing would steal the lead on the final restart on Lap 289 to win his third NASCAR Nextel Cup Series win of his career, his third of the season, and completing an Atlanta sweep for the 2005 season. To fill out the podium, Jeff Gordon of Hendrick Motorsports and Mark Martin of Roush Racing would finish second and third, respectively.

Background 

Atlanta Motor Speedway (formerly Atlanta International Raceway) is a track in Hampton, Georgia, 20 miles (32 km) south of Atlanta. It is a 1.54-mile (2.48 km) quad-oval track with a seating capacity of 111,000. It opened in 1960 as a 1.5-mile (2.4 km) standard oval. In 1994, 46 condominiums were built over the northeastern side of the track. In 1997, to standardize the track with Speedway Motorsports' other two 1.5-mile (2.4 km) ovals, the entire track was almost completely rebuilt. The frontstretch and backstretch were swapped, and the configuration of the track was changed from oval to quad-oval. The project made the track one of the fastest on the NASCAR circuit.

Entry list 

*Withdrew.

Practice

First practice 
The first one-hour practice session would occur on Friday, October 28, at 12:00 PM EST.

Second and final practice 
The second and final one-hour practice session, sometimes referred to as Happy Hour,  would occur on Friday, October 28, at 1:30 PM EST.

Qualifying 
Qualifying was held on Friday, October 28, at 7:10 PM EST. Each driver would have two laps to set a fastest time; the fastest of the two would count as their official qualifying lap.

Full qualifying results

Race results

References 

2005 NASCAR Nextel Cup Series
NASCAR races at Atlanta Motor Speedway
October 2005 sports events in the United States
2005 in sports in Georgia (U.S. state)